This is a list of California ballot propositions from 2020 to 2029.

Years

2020

2022 
Propositions in 2022 only appeared on the general election ballot.

References 

2020
Ballot propositions
21st century in law
Ballot propositions, 2020